Rhaphiptera tavakiliani is a species of beetle in the family Cerambycidae. It was described by S. A. Fragoso and Miguel A. Monné in 1984. It is known from French Guiana.

References

tavakiliani
Beetles described in 1984